Jessica Gordon Brown (born 25 December 1995) is an English weightlifter. She has represented England at the Commonwealth Games and won a silver medal.

Biography
Gordon Brown educated at the University of Brighton, competed in judo and gymnastics before turning to weightlifting. She was a double national acrobatic gymnastics champion. In 2021, she won the national weightlifting senior title in her weight category and finished 12th at the World Championships, in the 59kg category.

In 2022, she was selected for the 2022 Commonwealth Games in Birmingham, where she competed in the women's 59 kg category, winning the silver medal.

References

1995 births
Living people
English female weightlifters
Weightlifters at the 2022 Commonwealth Games
Commonwealth Games silver medallists for England
Commonwealth Games medallists in weightlifting
21st-century English women
Medallists at the 2022 Commonwealth Games